James Dyce Nicol (13 August 1805 – 16 November 1872) was a Scottish businessman, and then a Liberal politician who sat in the House of Commons from 1865 to 1872.

Nicol was the son of W. Nicol M.D. of Stonehaven and his wife Margaret Dyce daughter of J. Dyce of Aberdeen. He was educated at the University of Glasgow. He was a partner in the firm of Messrs. W. Nichol and Co. of Bombay, where he lived for many years until he retired in 1844, and then a director of the Borneo Company Limited from its inception in 1856 until 1869. Additionally, he was a deputy lieutenant and J.P. for Aberdeenshire and Kincardineshire, and a Fellow of the Royal Geographical Society.
 
At the 1865 general election Nicol was elected as the Member of Parliament (MP) for Kincardineshire. He held the seat until his death at the age of 67 in 1872.

Nicol married Sarah Loyd, daughter of Edward Loyd, banker of London and Manchester in 1844.

References

External links

1805 births
1872 deaths
Scottish Liberal Party MPs
Members of the Parliament of the United Kingdom for Scottish constituencies
UK MPs 1868–1874
UK MPs 1865–1868
Alumni of the University of Glasgow
Deputy Lieutenants of Aberdeenshire
Deputy Lieutenants of Kincardineshire
Fellows of the Royal Geographical Society